Biston quercii is a moth of the family Geometridae. It is found in China (Henan, Shaanxi, Gansu, Hubei, Sichuan).

References

Moths described in 1910
Bistonini